War Paint is the second album from American alternative rock band The Dangerous Summer, released through Hopeless Records. The album was released July 19, 2011.

War Paint debuted on the Billboard 200 at number 149, the band's first appearance on the chart. In October 2012, the band supported Lower Than Atlantis on their headlining UK tour.

Track listing

 War Paint - 4:09
 Work in Progress - 4:49
 No One’s Gonna Need You More - 4:15
 Good Things - 3:12
 Siren - 3:59
 Everyone Left - 4:22
 Miscommunication - 4:03
 I Should Leave Right Now - 3:36
 Parachute - 3:30
 In My Room - 4:20
 Waves - 3:43

Reception

References

2011 albums
The Dangerous Summer albums
Hopeless Records albums